Aliabad (also Romanized as ‘Alīābād; also known as Alinabad and Lazgi Bulāq) is a village in Ozomdel-e Jonubi Rural District, in the Central District of Varzaqan County, East Azerbaijan Province, Iran. At the 2006 census, its population was 285, in 56 families.

References 

Towns and villages in Varzaqan County